Maureen Elizabeth Church (née Griffiths; born 16 January 1930, in Swansea, Wales) is a Welsh-born botanist and a self-trained botanical illustrator. Her preferred technique was that of line drawings and her work is in the permanent collections of the Forest Herbarium in Oxford, the East African Herbarium in Nairobi, the Herbarium at Kew, and the University of Edinburgh.

She was awarded a B.Sc. (Botany) by the University of Sheffield in 1952, after which she attended St Hilda's College, Oxford. 

The Daubeny Herbarium in Oxford was the herbarium of the former Department of Forestry. Miss Maureen Griffiths arrived there as Herbarium Assistant in 1952 and started work on her thesis, "The Taxonomy and Ecology of the African species of Terminalia", at the same time preparing the illustrations for this work. In 1957 she left to start a career in free-lance illustrating. 

Terminalia griffithsiana Liben was named in her honour.

Publications
A revision of the African species of Terminalia - Maureen E. Griffiths, Journal of the Linnean Society of London, Botany, Volume 55, Issue 364, pages 818–907, June 1959
Kenya Trees and Shrubs - Ivan R. Dale & P. J. Greenway (1961) Buchanan's Kenya Estates Ltd.
Forest Flora of Northern Rhodesia - F. White (1962) Oxford University Press
Flora of Turkey and the East Aegean Islands - Peter H. Davies (1967) Edinburgh University Press
Flora of Tropical East Africa - Convolvulaceae - Verdcourt, B. (1963) London: Crown Agents for Oversea Governments and Administrations
Common Poisonous Plants of East Africa - Verdcourt, Bernard & E. C. Trump,  Collins, 1969. Hardcover, 254 pgs, map, botanical illustrations by Mrs. M. E. Church
Some Common Flowering Plants of Uganda - Edna Margaret Lind & A. C. Tallantire (1971) Oxford University Press
Flora of Tropical East Africa - Flacourtiaceae - Sleumer, H., 1975
Flora of Tropical East Africa - Rubiaceae (Part 1) - Verdcourt, B. (1976). Prepared at the Royal Botanic Gardens, Kew with assistance from the East African Herbarium.
Leguminosae of Ethiopia - Thulin, M. (1983), 49 line drawings by Maureen E. Church. Opera Botanica, Copenhagen 68: 1-223  
Flora of Tropical East Africa - Nymphaceae, Verbenaceae - B Verdcourt, AA Balkema 1989, 1992
Flora of Tropical East Africa - Boraginaceae - Verdcourt, B. (1991).  Prepared at the Royal Botanic Gardens, Kew with assistance from the East African Herbarium. 
Leguminosae of Ethiopia
Dendrochilum of Borneo

External links
International Exhibition of Botanical Art & Illustration- Hunt Institute

References

Botanical illustrators
Welsh botanists
1930 births
Living people